Joseph or Joe Bailey may refer to:

Sports
Joe Bailey (English footballer) (1890–1974), English footballer
Joe Bailey (Australian footballer) (1921–1996), Australian rules footballer
Joseph Bailey (cricketer) (born 1942), Bermudian cricketer
Joe Bailey (ice hockey), Canadian ice hockey player
Joe Bailey (wrestler) (1886–1951), Australian professional wrestler
J. C. Bailey (Joseph Carl Bailey Jr., 1983–2010), American professional wrestler

Politics
Sir Joseph Bailey, 1st Baronet (1783–1858), Welsh Ironmaster and MP for Worcester and Breconshire
Joseph Bailey (congressman) (1810–1885), U.S. Representative from Pennsylvania
Joseph Bailey (Sudbury MP) (1812–1850), British MP for Sudbury 1837–1841 and Herefordshire 1841–1850
Joseph M. Bailey (1833–1895), American jurist and politician
Joseph Bailey, 1st Baron Glanusk (1840–1906), British MP and Lord
Joseph Bailey, 2nd Baron Glanusk (1864–1928), British Army officer and peer
Joseph Weldon Bailey (1862–1929), Congressman and senator from Texas
Joseph Weldon Bailey Jr. (1892–1943), Congressman from Texas and son of Joseph Weldon Bailey

Other
Joseph Bailey (general) (1825–1867), American Civil War general 
Joseph Bailey (author), American author and psychologist

See also
Joseph Bailly (1774–1835), Canadian fur trader
Joseph A. Bailly (1825–1883), American sculptor
Joseph Baylee (1808–1883), theological writer
Jo Bailey (born 1970), maiden name of Jo Silvagni, Australian model and television personality